Alisa Alexandrovna Agafonova (married name: Besseghier, born 15 January 1991) is a former competitive ice dancer. She is best known for her partnership with Alper Uçar. Representing Turkey, they competed at two Winter Olympics (2014 and 2018) and won eight international medals, including silver at the 2011 Winter Universiade and three medals on the ISU Challenger Series. They skated in the final segment at six European Championships and four World Championships.

Competing with Dmitri Dun for Ukraine, Agafonova won five medals on the ISU Junior Grand Prix series and placed as high as 7th at the World Junior Championships (2008).

Personal life 
Agafonova was born on 15 January 1991 in Kharkiv, Ukraine. She studied business management at Kharkiv National University.

On 14 February 2020, Agafonova married French figure skater Chafik Besseghier.

Career

Early years 
Agafonova began learning to skate in 1997. Her first coach was Valeriy Barats.

Agafanova teamed up with Dmitri Dun in 2001. They represented Ukraine and competed on the novice level before making their ISU Junior Grand Prix (JGP) debut in September 2004, in Harbin, China. At the time, they were coached by Halyna Churylova and Svetlana Chernikova in Kharkiv.

In 2006, Agafonova/Dun won their first JGP medal, silver, in Taipei. Svetlana Chernikova and Marina Zoueva were listed as their coaches in the 2006–2007 and 2007–2008 seasons. In 2007–2008, they placed 4th at one JGP event, took silver at another, and finished 6th at the Junior Grand Prix Final. They placed 7th at the 2008 World Junior Championships in Sofia, Bulgaria.

In 2008–2009, Agafonova/Dun were coached by Chernikova, Zoueva, and Alexander Gorshkov. After winning gold and silver on the JGP series, they qualified to the JGP Final, where they finished 7th. Having won the Ukrainian national junior title, they were sent to the 2009 World Junior Championships and finished 13th in Sofia.

Coached by Gorshkov and Chernikova in Moscow, Agafonova/Dun won bronze at the 2009 JGP event in Minsk. After placing fourth at the JGP in Istanbul, in October 2009, they decided to end their partnership.

First three seasons with Uçar 
In 2010, Agafonova teamed up with Alper Uçar to compete for Turkey. They won a silver medal at the 2011 Winter Universiade, skating in their first season together.

Agafonova/Uçar placed 26th at the 2012 European Championships in Sheffield, England, and 31st at the 2012 World Championships in Nice, France.

Agafonova/Uçar were originally coached by Natalia Dubova and Oleg Voyko in Stamford, Connecticut. They changed coaches in December 2012, deciding to join Alexander Zhulin and Oleg Volkov in Moscow, Russia. They placed 13th at the 2013 European Championships in Zagreb, Croatia, and 28th at the 2013 World Championships in  London, Ontario, Canada.

2013–2014 season 
Agafonova/Uçar began their season at the 2013 Nebelhorn Trophy, the final Olympic qualifying opportunity. By finishing 5th, they earned a spot for Turkey in the ice dancing event at the Olympics. They then won a silver medal at the 2013 NRW Trophy.

Agafonova/Uçar finished 17th at the 2014 European Championships in Budapest, Hungary. In February, the two competed at the 2014 Winter Olympics in Sochi, Russia; their short dance placement, 22nd, was insufficient to advance to the next segment. They qualified to the free dance and finished 20th overall at the 2014 World Championships, which took place in March in Saitama, Japan.

2014–2015 season 
In December, Agafonova/Uçar won silver at the Santa Claus Cup in Hungary. In January, they took silver at the Toruń Cup in Poland and placed 12th at the 2015 European Championships in Stockholm, Sweden. In March, they achieved their career-best world placement, 16th, at the 2015 World Championships in Shanghai, China.

2015–2016 season 
Making their Grand Prix debut, Agafonova/Uçar placed 7th at the 2015 Trophée Éric Bompard in November. In December 2015, the two moved to Bloomfield Hills, Michigan to work with Anjelika Krylova and Pasquale Camerlengo due to visa problems which were exacerbated following the 2015 Russian Sukhoi Su-24 shootdown.

They finished 12th at the 2016 European Championships in Bratislava, Slovakia, and 21st at the 2016 World Championships in Boston, United States.

2016–2017 season 
Agafonova/Uçar received two Grand Prix assignments; they placed 9th at the 2016 Skate America and 8th at the 2016 Rostelecom Cup. They ranked 11th at the 2017 European Championships in Ostrava, Czech Republic. It was the best continental result of their career.

The two finished 17th at the 2017 World Championships in Helsinki, Finland. Due to their result, Turkey qualified a spot in the ice dancing event at the 2018 Winter Olympics.

2017–2018 season 

Agafonova/Uçar competed at two Grand Prix events and then won silver at the 2017 CS Tallinn Trophy. In January, they finished 13th at the 2018 European Championships in Moscow, Russia. In February, the two competed at the 2018 Winter Olympics and qualified to the final segment. They ranked 20th in the short dance, 18th in the free dance, and 19th overall in Pyeongchang, South Korea. They had the same result at the 2018 World Championships in Milan, Italy. They announced their retirement from competitive skating on March 25, 2018.

Programs

With Uçar

With Dun

Competitive highlights 
GP: Grand Prix; CS: Challenger Series; JGP: Junior Grand Prix

With Uçar for Turkey

With Dun for Ukraine

References

External links 

 
 
 Alisa Agafonova / Dmitri Dun at Tracings.net

1991 births
Living people
Sportspeople from Kharkiv
Turkish female ice dancers
Ukrainian female ice dancers
Ukrainian emigrants to Turkey
Figure skaters at the 2014 Winter Olympics
Olympic figure skaters of Turkey
Universiade medalists in figure skating
Naturalized citizens of Turkey
Figure skaters at the 2018 Winter Olympics
Universiade silver medalists for Turkey
Competitors at the 2011 Winter Universiade